Brandis Raley-Ross (born February 6, 1987) is an American professional basketball player for the Eastern Long Lions of the ASEAN Basketball League. He played college basketball for South Carolina.

Professional career
On October 30, 2016, Raley-Ross was selected by the Erie BayHawks with the 98th pick of the 2016 NBA Development League draft. On December 8, he was waived by the BayHawks. In eight games, he averaged 4.1 points, 2.0 rebounds and 1.1 assists in 19.3 minutes.

In July 2017, he signed for Mornar Bar. In July 2018, he signed for Cibona. Cibona parted ways with him on December 24, 2018.

References

External links
Brandis Raley-Ross at aba-liga.com
Brandis Raley-Ross at bbl.net

1987 births
Living people
ABA League players
African-American basketball players
American expatriate basketball people in Bulgaria
American expatriate basketball people in Croatia
American expatriate basketball people in Estonia
American expatriate basketball people in Greece
American expatriate basketball people in Lithuania
American expatriate basketball people in Montenegro
American expatriate basketball people in Slovakia
American men's basketball players
Basketball players from Charlotte, North Carolina
BC Beroe players
BC Kalev/Cramo players
BC Lietkabelis players
BC Rakvere Tarvas players
BC Tallinn Kalev players
BK Iskra Svit players
Erie BayHawks (2008–2017) players
Eastern Sports Club basketball players
KK Cibona players
KK Mornar Bar players
Panelefsiniakos B.C. players
Point guards
South Carolina Gamecocks men's basketball players
Korvpalli Meistriliiga players
ASEAN Basketball League players
21st-century African-American sportspeople
20th-century African-American people